Jean Paul Getty Sr. (December 15, 1892 – June 6, 1976) was an American-born British petroleum industrialist who founded the Getty Oil Company in 1942 and was the patriarch of the Getty family. A native of Minneapolis, he was the son of pioneer oilman George Getty. In 1957, Fortune magazine named him the richest living American, while the 1966 Guinness Book of Records named him as the world's richest private citizen, worth an estimated $1.2 billion (approximately $ billion in ). At his death, he was worth more than $6 billion (approximately $ billion in ). A book published in 1996 ranked him as the 67th richest American who ever lived, based on his wealth as a percentage of the concurrent gross national product.

Despite his vast wealth, Getty was infamously frugal, notably negotiating his grandson's kidnapping ransom in 1973. He had five children and divorced five times. Getty was an avid collector of art and antiquities. His collection formed the basis of the J. Paul Getty Museum in Los Angeles; more than $661 million of his estate was left to the museum after his death. He established the J. Paul Getty Trust in 1953. The trust, which is the world's wealthiest art institution, operates the J. Paul Getty Museum Complexes: the Getty Center, the Getty Villa and the Getty Foundation, the Getty Research Institute, as well as the Getty Conservation Institute.

Early life and education
Getty was born in Minneapolis, Minnesota, to Sarah Catherine McPherson (Risher) and George Getty, who was an attorney in the insurance industry. Getty was raised as a Methodist by his parents; his father was a devout Christian Scientist, and both were strict teetotalers. He was of part Scottish descent. In 1903, when Getty was 10 years old, George Getty traveled to Bartlesville, Oklahoma, and bought the mineral rights for 1,100 acres of land. The Getty family subsequently moved to Bartlesville, where J. Paul Getty attended the Garfield School. Within a few years Getty had established wells on the land that were producing 100,000 barrels of crude oil a month.

As newly minted millionaires, the family moved to Los Angeles. But, J. Paul Getty later returned to Oklahoma. At age 14, Getty attended Harvard Military School for a year, followed by Polytechnic High School, where he was given the nickname "Dictionary Getty" because of his love of reading. He became fluent in French, German and Italian. Getty was also conversational in Spanish, Greek, Arabic and Russian. A love of the classics led Getty to acquire reading proficiency in Ancient Greek and Latin.

He enrolled at the University of California, Berkeley, but did not complete a degree. Enamored with Europe after traveling abroad with his parents in 1910, Getty enrolled at the University of Oxford on November 28, 1912. A letter of introduction by then-President of the United States William Howard Taft enabled him to gain independent instruction from tutors at Magdalen College. Although he was not registered at Magdalen, he claimed the aristocratic students "accepted me as one of their own" and he fondly boasted of the friends he made, including Edward VIII, the future King of the United Kingdom. He obtained a diploma in economics and political science from Oxford in June 1913, then spent months traveling throughout Europe and Egypt before meeting his parents in Paris and returning with them to America in June 1914.

Career

In the autumn of 1914, George Getty gave his son $10,000 to invest in expanding the family's oil field holdings in Oklahoma. The first lot he bought, the Nancy Taylor No. 1 Oil Well Site near Haskell, Oklahoma, was crucial to his early financial success. The well struck oil in August 1915 and by the next summer the 40 percent net production royalty he accrued from it had made him a millionaire.

In 1919, Getty returned to business in Oklahoma. During the 1920s, he added about $3 million to his already sizable estate. His succession of marriages and divorces so distressed his father that Getty inherited only $500,000 of the $10 million fortune his father left at the time of his death in 1930. Getty was left with one-third of the stock from George Getty Inc., while his mother received the remaining two-thirds, giving her a controlling interest.

In 1936, Getty's mother convinced him to contribute to the establishment of a $3.3 million investment trust, called the Sarah C. Getty Trust, to ensure the family's ever-growing wealth could be channeled into a tax-free, secure income for future generations of the Getty family. The trust enabled Getty to have easy access to ready capital, which he was funneling into the purchase of Tidewater Petroleum stock.

Shrewdly investing his resources during the Great Depression, Getty acquired Pacific Western Oil Corporation and began the acquisition (completed in 1953) of the Mission Corporation, which included Tidewater Oil and Skelly Oil. In 1967, Getty merged these holdings into Getty Oil.

In 1948–1949, Getty paid Ibn Saud $9.5 million in cash, guaranteed $1 million a year, and a royalty of 55 cents a barrel for the Saudi Arabian Neutral Zone concession.  Oil was finally discovered in March 1953. Since 1953, Getty's gamble produced 16 million barrels a year, which contributed greatly to the fortune responsible for making him one of the richest people in the world.

Getty's wealth and ability to speak Arabic enabled his unparalleled expansion into the Middle East. Getty owned the controlling interest in about 200 businesses, including Getty Oil. Getty owned Getty Oil, Getty Inc., George F. Getty Inc., Pacific Western Oil Corporation, Mission Corporation, Mission Development Company, Tidewater Oil, Skelly Oil, Mexican Seaboard Oil, Petroleum Corporation of America, Spartan Aircraft Company, Spartan Cafeteria Company, Minnehoma Insurance Company, Minnehoma Financial Company, Pierre Hotel, Pierre Marques Hotel, a 15th-century palace and nearby castle at Ladispoli on the coast northwest of Rome, a Malibu ranch home, and Sutton Place, a 72-room mansion near Guildford, Surrey.

Art collection
Getty's first forays into collecting began in the late 1930s, when he took inspiration from the collection of 18th-century French paintings and furniture owned by the landlord of his New York City penthouse, Amy Guest, a relation of Sir Winston Churchill. A fan of 18th-century France, Getty began buying furniture from the period at reduced prices because of the depressed art market. He wrote several books on collecting, including Europe and the 18th Century (1949), Collector's Choice: The Chronicle of an Artistic Odyssey through Europe (1955) and The Joys of Collecting (1965). His stinginess limited the range of his collecting because he refused to pay full price. Getty's companion in later life, Penelope Kitson, said "Paul was really too mean ever to allow himself to buy a great painting." Nonetheless, at the time of his death he owned more than 600 items valued at more than $4 million, including paintings by Rubens, Titian, Gainsborough, Renoir, Tintoretto, Degas, and Monet. During the 1950s, Getty's interests shifted to Greco-Roman sculpture, which led to the building of the Getty Villa in the 1970s to house the collection. These items were transferred to the Getty Museum and the Getty Villa in Los Angeles after his death.

Marriages, divorces and children
Getty was a notorious womanizer from the time of his youth, something that horrified his conservative Christian parents. His lawyer, Robin Lund, once said that, "Paul could hardly ever say 'no' to a woman, or 'yes' to a man." Lord Beaverbrook had called him "Priapic" and "ever-ready" in his sexual habits.

In 1917, when he was 25, a paternity suit was filed against Getty in Los Angeles by Elsie Eckstrom, who claimed he was the father of her daughter, Paula. Eckstrom claimed that Getty had taken her virginity and fathered the child, while his legal team tried to undermine her credibility by claiming that she had a history of promiscuity. Getty agreed to a settlement of $10,000, upon which Eckstrom left town with the baby.

Getty was married and divorced five times. He had five sons with four of his wives:
 Jeanette Demont (married 1923 – divorced 1926); one son, George F. Getty II (1924–1973).
 Allene Ashby (1926–1928); no children. Getty met 17-year-old Ashby, the daughter of a Texas rancher, in Mexico City while he was studying Spanish and overseeing his family's business interests. They eloped to Cuernavaca, Mexico, but the marriage was bigamous as he was not yet divorced from Jeanette. The two quickly decided to dissolve the union while still in Mexico.
 Adolphine Helmle (1928–1932); one son, Jean Ronald Getty (1929–2009), whose son, Christopher Ronald Getty, married Pia Miller, sister of Marie-Chantal, Crown Princess of Greece. Like his first and second wives, Adolphine was 17 years old when Getty met her in Vienna. She was the daughter of a prominent German doctor who was opposed to her marrying the twice-divorced, 36-year-old Getty. The two eloped to Cuernavaca, where he had married Allene Ashby, then settled in Los Angeles. Following the birth of their son, Getty lost interest in her and her father convinced her to return to Germany with their child in 1929. After a protracted and contentious battle, their divorce was finalized in August 1932, with Adolphine receiving a huge sum for punitive damages and full custody of Ronald.
 Ann Rork (1932–1936); two sons, John Paul Getty Jr. (1932–2003) and Gordon Peter Getty (born 1933). Getty was introduced to Rork when she was 14 years old, but she did not become his romantic partner until she was 21 in 1930. Because he was in the midst of his divorce from Adolphine, the couple had to wait two years before they married. He was largely absent during their marriage, staying for long stretches of time in Europe. She sued him for divorce in 1936 alleging emotional abuse and neglect. She described an incident while the two were abroad in Italy in which she claimed Getty forced her to climb to view the crater of Mount Vesuvius while she was pregnant with their first son. The court decided in her favor and she was awarded $2,500 per month alimony plus $1,000 each in child support for her sons.
 Louise Dudley "Teddy" Lynch (1939–1958); one son, Timothy Ware Getty (1946–1958).

In 2013 at age 99, Getty's fifth wife, Louise, known as Teddy Getty Gaston, published a memoir reporting how Getty had scolded her for spending money too freely in the 1950s on the treatment of their six-year-old son, Timmy, who had become blind from a brain tumor. Timmy died at age 12, and Getty, living in England apart from his family who were in the U.S., did not attend the funeral. Gaston divorced Getty that year. Teddy Gaston died in April 2017 at the age of 103.

Getty was quoted as saying "A lasting relationship with a woman is only possible if you are a business failure," and, "I hate to be a failure. I hate and regret the failure of my marriages. I would gladly give all my millions for just one lasting marital success."

Kidnapping of grandson John Paul Getty III

In Rome on July 10, 1973, 'Ndrangheta kidnappers abducted Getty's 16-year-old grandson, John Paul Getty III, and demanded a $17 million (equivalent to $ in ) payment for his safe return. However, the family suspected a ploy by the rebellious teenager to extract money from his miserly grandfather. John Paul Getty Jr. asked his father for the money, but was refused, arguing that his 13 other grandchildren could also become kidnap targets if he paid.

In November 1973, an envelope containing a lock of hair and a human ear arrived at a daily newspaper. The second demand had been delayed three weeks by an Italian postal strike. The demand threatened that Paul would be further mutilated unless the victims paid $3.2 million. The demand stated "This is Paul's ear. If we don't get some money within 10 days, then the other ear will arrive. In other words, he will arrive in little bits."

When the kidnappers finally reduced their demands to $3 million, Getty agreed to pay no more than $2.2 million (equivalent to $ in ), the maximum that would be tax-deductible. He lent his son the remaining $800,000 at four percent interest. Getty's grandson was found alive on December 15, 1973, in a Lauria filling station, in the province of Potenza, shortly after the ransom was paid. After his release, the younger Getty called his grandfather to thank him for paying the ransom but Getty refused to come to the phone. Nine people associated with 'Ndrangheta were later arrested for the kidnapping, but only two were convicted. Getty III was permanently affected by the trauma and became a drug addict. After a stroke, brought on by a cocktail of drugs and alcohol in 1981, Getty III was rendered speechless, nearly blind and partially paralyzed for the rest of his life. He died on February 5, 2011, at the age of 54.

Getty defended his initial refusal to pay the ransom on two points. He argued that his 13 other grandchildren could also become kidnap targets if he paid, and also stated, "The second reason for my refusal was much broader-based. I contend that acceding to the demands of criminals and terrorists merely guarantees the continuing increase and spread of lawlessness, violence and such outrages as terror-bombings, "skyjackings" and the slaughter of hostages that plague our present-day world."

Nine of the kidnappers were apprehended, including Girolamo Piromalli and Saverio Mammoliti, high-ranking members of the 'Ndrangheta, a Mafia organization in Calabria. Two of the kidnappers were convicted and sent to prison; the others were acquitted for lack of evidence, including the 'Ndrangheta bosses. Most of the ransom money was never recovered.

Reputation for frugality
Many anecdotal stories exist of Getty's reputed thriftiness and parsimony, which struck observers as comical, even perverse, because of his extreme wealth. The two most widely known examples are his reluctance to pay his grandson's $17 million kidnapping ransom, and a notorious pay-phone he had installed at Sutton Place. A darker incident was his fifth wife's claim that Getty had scolded her for spending too much on their terminally ill son's medical treatment, though he was worth tens of millions of dollars at the time. He was well known for bargaining on almost everything to obtain the lowest possible price, including suites at luxury hotels and virtually all purchases of artwork and real estate. In 1959, Sutton Place, a 72-room mansion, was purchased from George Sutherland-Leveson-Gower, 5th Duke of Sutherland, for £60,000, about half of what the Duke paid for it 40 years earlier.

Getty's secretary claimed that Getty did his laundry by hand because he didn't want to pay for his clothes to be laundered. When his shirts became frayed at the cuffs, he would trim the frayed part instead of purchasing new shirts.
Re-using stationery was another obsession of Getty's. He had a habit of writing responses to letters on the margins or back sides and mailing them back, rather than using a new sheet of paper. He also carefully saved and re-used manila envelopes, rubber bands and other office supplies.
When Getty took a group of friends to a dog show in London, he made them walk around the block for 10 minutes until the tickets became half-priced at 5 pm, because he didn't want to pay the full 5 shillings per head.
Getty moved to Sutton Place in part because the cost of living was cheaper than in London, where he had resided at the Ritz. He once boasted to American columnist Art Buchwald that it cost 10 cents for a rum and coke at Sutton Place, whereas at the Ritz it was more than a dollar.
Getty drove his own car to work every day.

Author John Pearson attributed part of Getty's extreme penny-pinching to the Methodist sensibility of Getty's upbringing, which emphasized modest living and personal economy. His business acumen was also a major factor in Getty's thriftiness. "He would allow himself no self-indulgence in the purchase of a place to live, a work of art, even a piece of furniture, unless he could convince himself that it would appreciate in value."
 Getty claimed his frugality towards others was a response to people taking advantage of him and not paying their fair share. "It's not the money I object to, it's the principle of the thing that bothers me ..."

Coin-box telephone
Getty famously had a payphone installed at Sutton Place, helping to seal his reputation as a miser. Getty placed dial-locks on all the regular telephones, limiting their use to authorized staff, and the coin-box telephone was installed for others. In his autobiography, he described his reasons:

When speaking in a televised interview with Alan Whicker in February 1963, Getty said that he thought guests would want to use a payphone. After 18 months, Getty explained, "the in-and-out traffic flow at Sutton subsided. Management and operation of the house settled into a reasonable routine. With that, the pay-telephone [was] removed, and the dial-locks were taken off the telephones in the house."

Later years and death
On June 30, 1960, Getty threw a 21st birthday party for a relative of his friend, the 16th Duke of Norfolk, which served as a housewarming party for the newly purchased Sutton Place. Party goers were irritated by Getty's stinginess, such as not providing cigarettes and relegating everyone to using creosote portable toilets outside. At about 10 p.m. the party descended into pandemonium as party crashers arrived from London, swelling the already overcrowded halls and causing an estimated £20,000 in damage. A valuable silver ewer by the 18th century silversmith Paul de Lamerie was stolen, but returned anonymously when the London newspapers began covering the theft. The failure of the event made Getty the object of ridicule and he never threw another large party again.

Getty remained an inveterate hard worker, boasting at age 74 that he often worked 16 to 18 hours per day overseeing his operations across the world. The value of Getty Oil shares quadrupled during the Arab-Israeli Yom Kippur War of October 1973, which caused a worldwide oil shortage for years. Getty's earnings topped $25.8 million in 1975.

Getty met the English interior designer Penelope Kitson in the 1950s and entrusted her with decorating his homes and the public rooms of the oil tankers he was launching. From 1960, Kitson resided in a cottage on the grounds of Sutton Place. Getty and Kitson maintained a platonic relationship and Getty held her in high respect and trust.

Getty's insatiable appetite for sex also continued into his 80s. He used an experimental drug, H3, to maintain his potency. Mistresses who resided at Sutton Place included the married Mary Teissier, a distant cousin of the last Tsar of Russia, Lady Ursula d'Abo, who had close connections to the British Royal Family, and Nicaraguan-born Rosabella Burch.

The New York Times wrote of Getty's domestic arrangement: "[Getty] ended his life with a collection of desperately hopeful women, all living together in his Tudor mansion in England, none of them aware that his favorite pastime was rewriting his will, changing his insultingly small bequests: $209 a month to one, $1,167 to another." Only Kitson received a significant bequest upon Getty's death, receiving 5,000 shares of Getty Oil, which doubled in value during the 1980s, and a $1,167 monthly income.

Getty died of heart failure at the age of 83 on June 6, 1976, in Sutton Place near Guildford, Surrey. He was buried in Pacific Palisades, Los Angeles County, California at the Getty Villa. The gravesite is not open to the public.

Media portrayals
Rudy De Luca portrayed Getty in the 1991 Mel Brooks film Life Stinks, in which Brooks plays a real estate tycoon who took a bet that he couldn't live in the streets as a derelict for a month, who then several times throughout the film runs into a homeless man who claims to be Getty in a similar situation but neither believe each other. It's never confirmed if this was supposed to actually be Getty, or just a homeless person with a personality disorder, but is credited as "J. Paul Getty".

Christopher Plummer portrayed Getty in the 2017 film All the Money in the World, which dramatizes the kidnapping of his grandson. Getty was originally portrayed by Kevin Spacey, but after sexual misconduct allegations surfaced against Spacey ahead of the film's premiere, Plummer was cast to re-film his scenes. For his performance, Plummer received an Academy Award nomination for Best Supporting Actor.

The kidnapping is also dramatized in the first season of the American anthology drama series Trust, where Getty is portrayed by Donald Sutherland.

Quotations
J. Paul Getty has one entry in the 8th Edition of The Oxford Dictionary of Quotations.
“If you can actually count your money, then you are not really a rich man.”

Published works
 Getty, J. Paul. The history of the bigger oil business of George F.S. F. and J. Paul Getty from 1903 to 1939. Los Angeles?, 1941, 
 Getty, J. Paul. Europe in the Eighteenth Century. [Santa Monica, Calif.]: privately printed, 1949, 
 Le Vane, Ethel, and J. Paul Getty. Collector's Choice: The Chronicle of an Artistic Odyssey through Europe. London: W.H. Allen, 1955, 
 Getty, J. Paul. My Life and Fortunes. New York: Duell, Sloan & Pearce, 1963, 
 Getty, J. Paul. The Joys of Collecting. New York: Hawthorn Books, 1965, 
 Getty, J. Paul. How to be Rich. Chicago: Playboy Press, 1965, 
 Getty, J. Paul. The Golden Age. New York: Trident Press, 1968, 
 Getty, J. Paul. How to be a Successful Executive. Chicago: Playboy Press, 1971, 
 Getty, J. Paul. As I See It: The Autobiography of J. Paul Getty. Englewood Cliffs, N.J. : Prentice-Hall, 1976. ,

See also
 List of richest Americans in history
 List of wealthiest historical figures

References

Further reading
 Hewins, Ralph. The Richest American: J. Paul Getty. New York: Dutton, 1960.
 Lund, Robina. The Getty I Knew. Kansas City: Sheed Andrews and McMeel, 1977. .
 Miller, Russell. The House of Getty. New York: Henry Holt, 1985. .
 de Chair, Somerset Struben. Getty on Getty: a man in a billion. London: Cassell, 1989. .
 Pearson, John. Painfully Rich: J. Paul Getty and His Heirs. London: Macmillan, 1995. .
 Wooster, Martin Morse. Philanthropy Hall of Fame, J. Paul Getty. philanthropyroundtable.org.

External links

J. Paul Getty diaries, 1938–1946, 1948–1976 finding aid, Getty Research Institute, Los Angeles. 
J. Paul Getty family collected papers, 1880s–1989, undated (bulk 1911–1977) finding aid, Getty Research Institute, Los Angeles. 
J. Paul Getty and Ashby sisters papers, 1926-1992, finding aid, Getty Research Institute, Los Angeles.

1892 births
1976 deaths
20th-century American businesspeople
Alumni of Magdalen College, Oxford
American art collectors
American autobiographers
American business writers
American businesspeople in the oil industry
American billionaires
American emigrants to England
American people of Scotch-Irish descent
American philanthropists
Businesspeople from Los Angeles
Businesspeople from Minneapolis
Businesspeople from Tulsa, Oklahoma
Deaths from congestive heart failure
English people of Irish descent
Museum founders
J. Paul
J
John H. Francis Polytechnic High School alumni
 
Philanthropists from California
University of California, Berkeley alumni